Elachista dispilella is a moth of the family Elachistidae. It is found from Fennoscandia to the Pyrenees and Italy and from France to Romania.

Adults are on wing from May to August in one or two generations per year.

The larvae feed on Festuca heterophylla, Festuca lemanii and Festuca ovina. They mine the leaves of their host plant. The mine consists of a long, narrow corridor that descends from the tip of the leaf to the base. Larvae can found from May to June in the north and in April and again in June in the south. They are greyish green with a brown head.

References

dispilella
Moths described in 1839
Moths of Europe